Kaluga Turbine Plant is a company based in Kaluga, Russia and established in 1946. 
The Kaluga Turbine Plant Production Association produces turbines for naval ships and submarines. It also produces turbines for civilian power plants. It is located near the Kaluga Motor-Building Plant.

Turbokon

References

External links
 Official website

Engine manufacturers of Russia
Gas turbine manufacturers
Marine engine manufacturers
Companies based in Kaluga Oblast
Power Machines
Ministry of the Shipbuilding Industry (Soviet Union)
Engine manufacturers of the Soviet Union
Defence companies of the Soviet Union